The South African type WE tender was a steam locomotive tender from the pre-Union era in the Cape of Good Hope.

Type WE tenders entered service in 1901, as tenders to the 6th Class  Tenwheeler type steam locomotives which were acquired by the Cape Government Railways from Schenectady Locomotive Works in that year. These locomotives were designated Class 6G on the South African Railways in 1912.

Manufacturer
Type WE tenders were built by Schenectady Locomotive Works in 1901.

The Cape Government Railways (CGR) placed eight redesigned  Tenwheeler type steam locomotives in service in 1901, designed and built by the Schenectady Locomotive Works to the specifications of the CGR locomotive department. These locomotives were designated Class 6G on the South African Railways (SAR) in 1912. The Type WE entered service as tenders to these engines.

Characteristics

Locomotive
In the SAR years, tenders were numbered for the engines they were delivered with. In most cases, an oval number plate, bearing the engine number and often also the tender type, would be attached to the rear end of the tender. During the classification and renumbering of locomotives onto the SAR roster in 1912, no separate classification and renumbering list was published for tenders, which should have been renumbered according to the locomotive renumbering list.

Only the Schenectady-built Class 6G locomotives were delivered new with Type WE tenders, renumbered in the SAR number range from 606 to 613.

Classification letters
Since many tender types are interchangeable between different locomotive classes and types, a tender classification system was adopted by the SAR. The first letter of the tender type indicates the classes of engines to which it can be coupled. The "W_" tenders could be used with the locomotive classes as shown, although in some cases, such as with Class 6G locomotives, the drawbar and safety chains had to be altered to suit the target engine.
 CGR 6th Class of 1901 (Schenectady), SAR Class 6G.
 SAR Class 8R.
 CGR 8th Class 2-8-0 of 1901, SAR Class 8X.

The second letter indicates the tender's water capacity.

References

WE